Estadio Municipal Doctor Olegario Henríquez Escalante is a multi-use stadium in San Antonio, Chile.  It is used mostly for football matches and is the home stadium of San Antonio Unido. The stadium holds 2,024 people.

References

Sports venues in Valparaíso Region
Football venues in Chile